The Little Joe 1B was a launch escape system test of the Mercury spacecraft, conducted as part of the U.S. Mercury program. The mission also carried a female rhesus monkey (Macaca mulatta) named Miss Sam in the Mercury spacecraft. The mission was launched January 21, 1960, from Wallops Island, Virginia. The Little Joe 1B flew to an apogee of 9.3 statute miles (15.0 km) and a range of 11.7 miles (18.9 km) out to sea. Miss Sam survived the 8 minute 35 second flight in good condition. The spacecraft was recovered by a Marine helicopter and returned to Wallops Island within about 45 minutes. Miss Sam was one of many monkeys used in space travel research.

Gallery

See also
 Little Joe
 Sam (monkey), NASA Project Mercury rhesus monkey
 Monkeys and apes in space
 List of individual monkeys

References

External links
 NASA Project Mercury Mission LJ-1B at Kennedy Space Science and Technology website
 Wallops Flight Facility at Encyclopedia Astronautica

Project Mercury
1960 in the United States